Hawijat al-Sallah is a village in northern Syria, administratively part of the Hama Governorate, located north of Hama. It is situated in the Ghab plain. Nearby localities include subdistrict center Qalaat al-Madiq to the southeast, Kafr Nabudah to the east, al-Huwash to the north, Shathah to the northwest and Inab to the west. According to the Syria Central Bureau of Statistics (CBS), Hawijat al-Sallah had a population of 3,134 in the 2004 census.

References

Populated places in al-Suqaylabiyah District
Populated places in al-Ghab Plain